Licoma is a location in the La Paz Department in Bolivia. It is the seat of the Licoma Pampa Municipality, the sixth municipal section of the Inquisivi Province.

References 

 Instituto Nacional de Estadistica de Bolivia

Populated places in La Paz Department (Bolivia)